Frank Hughes Murkowski (born March 28, 1933) is an American politician and a member of the Republican Party. He was a United States Senator from Alaska from 1981 until 2002 and the eighth governor of Alaska from 2002 until 2006. In his 2006 re-election bid, he finished in third place in the Republican primary behind Sarah Palin and John Binkley. Murkowski is notable for having appointed his daughter, Lisa Murkowski, to replace him in the U.S. Senate after he resigned his Senate seat to become governor of Alaska.

Early life and education 
Murkowski was born in Seattle, Washington, the son of Helen (née Hughes) and Frank M. Murkowski. His paternal grandfather was of Polish descent. Murkowski attended Ketchikan High School in Alaska, graduating in 1951. He studied at Santa Clara University from 1951 to 1953, and earned a BS in economics from Seattle University in 1955. He joined the United States Coast Guard in the summer of 1955 and served until 1957 – the year his daughter Lisa was born. He was stationed in Sitka and Ketchikan, Alaska, and aboard the cutters Sorrel and Thistle.

Career 
After a stint at Pacific National Bank and further study at Pacific Coast Banking School, Murkowski became Alaska's youngest commissioner at the time when he was appointed Commissioner of Economic Development, aged 33, and was elevated to the presidency of the Alaska National Bank of the North in 1971. He has also headed the Alaska Bankers Association and – in 1977 - the Alaska State Chamber of Commerce.

He ran for Alaska's sole U.S. House seat in 1970, but was defeated by Democratic state Senator Nick Begich.

U.S. Senate 

He was first elected to the U.S. Senate in 1980, defeating Democratic candidate Clark Gruening, with the help of Ronald Reagan's popularity. He won with 54% of the vote. He was re-elected in 1986, 1992, and 1998.
During his time in the Senate, he was most notable as Chairman of the Energy and Natural Resources Committee from 1995 to 2001. As chair, he argued and attempted unsuccessfully to open the Arctic National Wildlife Refuge to oil drilling.

Murkowski had an anti-abortion record in the Senate. He also opposed gun control and affirmative action.

In a floor statement in the Senate, regarding the ban of homosexuals serving in the military, Murkowski stated that homosexuals have a right to choose their lifestyle, but there exists no right to serve. In his opposition to lifting the ban, his speech focused on the cost effect on the Veterans Administration in treating service members infected with HIV. His daughter and successor in the Senate, Lisa Murkowski, voted to repeal the ban on homosexuals in the armed services, and later became the third Republican Senator to endorse the legalization of same-sex marriage while in office.

Governor 

Murkowski was elected governor on November 5, 2002, receiving nearly 56% of the vote, the highest percentage for any Republican gubernatorial nominee in Alaska history up until that point. He succeeded Democrat Tony Knowles and took office on December 2, 2002.

Upon his inauguration, he resigned his Senate seat and appointed his daughter, Lisa Murkowski, the Majority Leader-designate of the Alaska House of Representatives, in his place. The appointment was widely criticized as an act of nepotism.

Toward the end of his administration he brokered a deal for a gas pipeline that was never considered, in final form, by the legislature. Murkowski threatened to sign the deal without legislative approval, but the legislature successfully brought a lawsuit to enjoin him from doing so.

Governor Murkowski ran for re-election in 2006, but came in third behind former Wasilla Mayor Sarah Palin and businessman John Binkley in the Republican primary election on August 22, 2006 (Palin winning with 51% and Binkley taking second with 30% to Murkowski's 19%). Murkowski's margin of defeat was the largest in any Republican primary by an incumbent governor in United States history. Murkowski left office with one of the nation's worst approval ratings of 19%.

On March 4, 2008, Murkowski's former chief-of-staff, Jim Clark admitted that he was aware that Veco Corp had paid $10,000 for a political poll to gauge the popularity of then-incumbent Governor Murkowski. Clark was charged with "honest services fraud". Before he was sentenced, the US Supreme Court ruled that the statute was drafted with unconstitutional vagueness and henceforth will only cover "fraudulent schemes to deprive another of honest services through bribes or kickbacks supplied by a third party who ha[s] not been deceived." Since Clark was guilty of neither bribes nor kickbacks, all charges were voided.

In all 28 years of public service, Murkowski spent two years in the armed services, 22 years as Alaska's junior senator in D.C. and four years as governor.

Murkowski considered attempting a return to the governorship in the 2018 election, but ultimately decided against it.

Jet plane scandal 
In 2005, despite opposition from the Alaska Legislature, Murkowski purchased a Westwind II jet with state money for $2.7 million. This purchase became the symbol of his unpopular legacy in state politics, so much so that his successor, Sarah Palin, promised to sell the jet once she became governor.

Electoral history 
 United States House of Representatives election in Alaska, 1970
 Nick Begich (D), 55%
 Frank Murkowski (R), 45%
 United States Senate election in Alaska, 1980
 Frank Murkowski (R), 54%
 Clark Gruening (D), 46%
 United States Senate election in Alaska, 1986
 Frank Murkowski (R) (inc.), 54%
 Glenn Olds (D), 44%
 United States Senate election in Alaska, 1992
 Frank Murkowski (R) (inc.), 53%
 Tony Smith (D), 38%
 Mary Jordan (Grn.), 8%
 United States Senate election in Alaska, 1998
 Frank Murkowski (R) (inc.), 75%
 Joe Sonneman (D), 20%
 2002 Alaska gubernatorial election
 Frank Murkowski (R), 56%
 Fran Ulmer (D), 41%
 2006 Alaska gubernatorial election (Republican primary)
 Sarah Palin (R), 51%
 John Binkley (R), 30%
 Frank Murkowski (R) (incumbent), 19%

References

External links
 FrankMurkowski.com

 Governor Murkowski rated the most unpopular governor in the entire U.S., via alaskareport.com
 

|-

|-

|-

|-

|-

|-

1933 births
21st-century American politicians
American bankers
American politicians of Polish descent
Republican Party governors of Alaska
Living people
Politicians from Fairbanks, Alaska
People from Ketchikan Gateway Borough, Alaska
People from Wrangell, Alaska
Politicians from Seattle
Military personnel from Seattle
Republican Party United States senators from Alaska
Sarah Palin
Seattle University alumni
State cabinet secretaries of Alaska
United States Coast Guard enlisted
Military personnel from Fairbanks, Alaska
Businesspeople from Fairbanks, Alaska